2017 Men's Volleyball Thai-Denmark Super League was the 4th edition of the tournament. It was held at the MCC Hall of The Mall Bangkapi in Bangkok, Thailand from 22 – 26 March 2017.

Teams
  Air Force
  Nakhon Ratchasima
  Samanun Koh Kood Cabana Ratchaburi
  NK Fitness Samutsakhon
  Diamond Food RMUTL Phitsanulok
  Kasetsart

Pools composition

Preliminary round

Pool A

|}

|}

Pool B

|}

|}

Final round

Semifinals

|}

Final

|}

Final standing

Awards

See also 
 2017 Women's Volleyball Thai-Denmark Super League

References

Volleyball,Men's Thai-Denmark Super League
Thai-Denmark Super League
Thai-Denmark Super League